Arayatlı (also, Arayatly) is a village and municipality in the Fuzuli District of Azerbaijan. It has a population of 990.

Notable natives 
 Shamama Hasanova – Twice Hero of Socialist Labor.

References

External links 

Populated places in Fuzuli District